Kimsaqucha or Kimsa Qucha (Quechua kimsa three, qucha lake, "three lakes", also spelled  Quimsacocha, also Kimsacocha, Kimsaqocha, Kinsa Qocha, Kinsaccocha, Kinsacocha, Kinsaqocha, Quimsa Ccocha, Quimsa Khocha, Quimsaccocha, Quimsacocha, Quinsa Khocha, Quinsa Kocha) may refer to:

Lakes 
 Kimsaqucha (Lamay), a lake in the Lamay District, Calca Province, Cusco Region, Peru
 Kimsaqucha (Pisac), a lake in the Pisac District, Calca Province, Cusco Region, Peru
 Kimsaqucha (Puno), a lake in the Puno Region, Peru

Mountain 
 Kimsa Qucha (Bolivia), a mountain in Bolivia
 Kimsaqucha (Apurímac), a mountain in the Apurímac Region, Peru